Berriatua is a town and municipality located in the province of Biscay, in the autonomous community of the Basque Country, in the north of Spain. Its neighbors are Ondarroa and the Bay of Biscay to the north, Markina-Xemein to the south, Mutriku to the east, Amoroto and Mendexa to the west. Historically Berriatua was a town of farmers with little industry. Recently the town has seen significant industrial growth as well as a great deal of construction.

Notable people
 
 
Xabi Garalde (born 1988), Spanish footballer

References

External links
Berriatua Bizi
BERRIATUA in the Bernardo Estornés Lasa - Auñamendi Encyclopedia (Euskomedia Fundazioa) 

Municipalities in Biscay